Chillingworth is a surname, and may refer to:

 Curtis Chillingworth (1896–1955), a Florida attorney and state judge
 Daniel Chillingworth, an English football player 
 David Chillingworth, one of the seven diocesan bishops of the Scottish Episcopal Church
 Roger Chillingworth, a character from Nathaniel Hawthorne's novel The Scarlet Letter (1850)
 Sonny Chillingworth, a slack-key guitar player from Hawaii 
 William Chillingworth (1602–1644), a controversial English churchman